Gregory Joseph Pence (born November 14, 1956) is an American businessman and politician serving as the U.S. representative for Indiana's 6th congressional district since 2019. The district serves much of east-central Indiana, including Pence's hometown of Columbus, as well as Greenfield, Richmond, Shelbyville, and the southern suburbs of Indianapolis in Marion and Johnson Counties. A member of the Republican Party, he is the older brother of former U.S. Vice President Mike Pence, who represented the district from 2001 to 2013.

Early life
Born in Columbus, Indiana, on November 14, 1956, Pence is the oldest of six children born to his parents, Ann Jane "Nancy" (née Cawley) and Edward Joseph Pence Jr., who ran a group of gas stations. He was raised in the Catholic faith. According to his mother, Pence and his three brothers rode wagons in a 1964 campaign parade for Republican presidential nominee Barry Goldwater.

Pence earned a B.A. in theology and philosophy and a Master of Business Administration in 1983 from Loyola University Chicago. He earned a commission in the Marines in 1981 after receiving his undergraduate degree and served for five and a half years, rising to the rank of first lieutenant. In 1983, his battalion was stationed in Beirut, Lebanon, and shipped out shortly before the bombings.

Business career
Pence owns and operates antique malls in southern Indiana.

After being honorably discharged from the Marine Corps, Pence joined Kiel Brothers Oil Company in 1988, after his father died, and served as its president from 1998 to 2004. After his departure, the company filed for Chapter 11 bankruptcy protection in 2004. Through the company, he also ran a chain of gas stations and convenience stores.

According to some reports, the cleanup from the defunct business sites has cost Indiana at least $21 million. Pence also worked for Marathon Oil and Unocal. In 1999, he was elected to the board of directors of Home Federal Bancorp and its subsidiary Home Federal Savings Bank.

U.S. House of Representatives

Elections

2018 

Pence was the finance chairman in U.S. Representative Luke Messer's 2018 campaign for the U.S. Senate. In October 2017, Pence launched his own campaign for the position Messer was leaving. On May 8, 2018, Pence won the Republican nomination for the U.S. House seat his brother Mike had held for 12 years. With Pence raising and spending about $1 million as of mid-April and his closest Republican challenger loaning himself about three quarters of that amount, it made the "race the most expensive in the state." Pence faced Democrat Jeannine Lake in the November general election and won by a margin of over 30%.

2020 

Pence defeated Lake in a rematch in the November 3 general election with 68.6% of the vote.

Tenure
In December 2020, Pence was one of 126 Republican members of the House of Representatives to sign an amicus brief in support of Texas v. Pennsylvania, a lawsuit filed at the United States Supreme Court contesting the results of the 2020 presidential election, in which Joe Biden defeated incumbent Donald Trump.

In May 2021, Pence voted against a House bill establishing a January 6 commission, accusing Speaker Nancy Pelosi and Democrats of partisan plans to use the commission to carry out the "political execution of Donald Trump". The bill passed.

In August 2022, Pence criticized President Joe Biden for forgiving up to $10,000 of student loan debt for eligible borrowers. Pence was criticized for hypocrisy because he had $79,441 of debt from his PPP loan forgiven.

Committee assignments
Committee on Energy and Commerce
Subcommittee on Energy
Subcommittee on Consumer Protection and Commerce

Electoral history

Personal life
Pence and his wife, Denise, own two antique malls. They have four children and nine grandchildren. Pence is a practicing Catholic and attends St. Bartholomew Catholic Church in Columbus.

Denise Pence was an Indiana delegate at the 2016 Republican National Convention and cast her vote for Donald Trump and Mike Pence to be the party's nominees. Pence and his family were in attendance at Trump's inauguration, seated several rows behind him. Their oldest daughter, Nicole, is a TV anchor in Indianapolis and their son, John, worked on Trump's 2020 campaign as a senior advisor and is married to Kellyanne Conway's cousin Giovanna Coia.

References

External links
 Congressman Greg Pence official U.S. House website
Campaign site

|-

1956 births
21st-century American politicians
American businesspeople in the oil industry
American Roman Catholics
Catholics from Indiana
Living people
Loyola University Chicago alumni
Military personnel from Indiana
People from Columbus, Indiana
United States Marine Corps officers
Pence family
Republican Party members of the United States House of Representatives from Indiana